Nishi Kohli (known professionally as Nishi) is an Indian actress who has worked in Punjabi and Hindi-language films. She frequently acted with Dara Singh.

Career
Although Nishi was a Punjabi film star, she also worked in Hindi films where she was often cast in secondary roles. She worked in A-list films in Punjab that earned national film awards. Her most prominent Punjabi films are Main Jatti Punjab Di, alongside co-star, Prem Nath and Satluj De Kandhe, alongside co-star Balraj Sahni.

Nishi was an actress during the black-and-white era of Punjabi cinema, but later received opportunities to act in color films of Bollywood, where she acted with stars including Dara Singh, Raj Kapoor, Balraj Sahni, Bharat Bhushan, Helen, Ashok Kumar, Shashi Kapoor, Madhubala, Mala Sinha, and Rajendra Kumar. While she was cast as a leading actress in Punjabi films, she took supporting roles in Bollywood films with heroines such as Mala Sinha, Madhubala and Vyajayanthimala. Nishi's notable Bollywood films include Main Nashe Mein Hoon, Ganwaar, Phagun", Boyfriend, Naya Kanoon and Railway Platform. Later she married producer Raj Kumar Kohli, who made "snake-woman" thrillers such as Nagin and Jaani Dushman.

Nishi acted in 68 films in Hindi.

Personal life 
Nishi Kohli has a son, Armaan Kohli and older son Gogi Kohli. Her son is also an actor. He acted in his father's films Badle Ki Aag and Raaj Tilak as a child actor. Nishi Kohli launched her son in her husband's production film too, but the actor then went on to appear in TV shows such as Big Boss.

Filmography

Punjabi films

1969 – Nanak Naam Jahaz Hai
1969 -   Danka with Dara Singh 
1966 -   Dulla Bhatti with Dara Singh
1966 – Laiye Tod Nibhaiye as Jeto
1965 –  Dharti Veeran Di
1964 - Satluj De Kandhe
1964 – Main Jatti Punjab Di1963- Lado Rani1963 – Laajo1963 -  Sapni1963 - Pind di kudi1962 – Banto
1962 - Dhol Jaani
1961 – Guguddiddi
1961 - Guddi
1961 - Jija Ji
1959 – Bhangra as Banto

Hindi films

1955 – Railway Platform as Mrs. Kapoor
1955 – Char Paise as Roop
1958 – Phagun as Rajkumari
1958 – Baghi Sipahi as Emperor's wife
1959 – Main Nashe Mein Hoon as Rita Bakshi
1959 -    Kya Yeh Bombai Hai
1959 - Insaan Jaag Utha as Hansa / Riny
1960 – Tu Nahin Aur Sahi as Bimla
1961 – Boy Friend as Sushma
1964 – Hercules1964-  Ek Din Ka Badshah 
1964 – Darasingh: Ironman as Madhumati H. Singh
1964 – Badshah as Sheeba/Tingu
1965 – Lootera as Shabana
1970 – Ganwaar as Mrs. Rai

References

External links

Nishi (Actress) Profile an Bio

Actresses in Hindi cinema
Living people
Place of birth missing (living people)
Year of birth missing (living people)
Indian film actresses
Actresses in Punjabi cinema
Actresses from Punjab, India
20th-century Indian actresses